Nnenna is an Igbo name which translates to "a father's mother" in English. It is a feminine name given to girls who are believed to be reincarnates of their paternal grandmother. Notable people with the name include:
 Nnenna Freelon (born 1954), American jazz singer
 Nnenna Lynch (born 1971), retired distance track event runner
 Lydia Nnenna Obute, Nigerian-Austrian model
 Nnenna Nwakanma (born 1975), Nigerian activist
 Adaora Nnenna Elonu (born 1990), Nigerian-American basketball player
 Nnenna Okore (born 1975), Nigerian artist
 Ifeoma Nnenna Dieke (born 1981), American-born Scottish footballer

References

Igbo given names